Phlaeoba antennata is a species of short-horned grasshopper in the family Acrididae. It is found in Indomalaya.

Subspecies
These subspecies belong to the species Phlaeoba antennata:
 Phlaeoba antennata antennata Brunner von Wattenwyl, 1893
 Phlaeoba antennata malayensis Bolívar, 1914

References

External links

 

Acridinae